Michael Caruso is an American magazine editor. He is the fourth editor-in-chief of the Smithsonian magazine, a position he held from 2011 to 2019. He was credited for coining the term "elevator pitch."

Biography 
Caruso grew up in Lake Forest, Illinois, and graduated from Columbia University in 1983. His father, Jerome Caruso, is an industrial designer who has designed International Design Excellence Award-winning pieces for Herman Miller, Rockwell International, Motorola and was called "The Man Behind The Kitchen Revolution" by Businessweek.

He joined the journalism industry by working for The New Yorker as a messenger, before becoming executive editor of The Village Voice. He was recruited by Tina Brown to Vanity Fair and served as senior articles editor, during which he worked with the likes of Norman Mailer and Joyce Carol Oates and coined the term "elevator pitch." He served as editor-in-chief of Los Angeles magazine, Details magazine, Men’s Journal, the founding editor of the now-defunct Maximum Golf, and was an editor-at-large at Portfolio magazine.

He was the deputy editor of the WSJ magazine before being hired by the Smithsonian Institution to serve as the fourth editor-in-chief of its magazine, the Smithsonian. As editor-in-chief, Caruso introduced a poetry feature and began organizing issues around themes and commissioned pieces by Ruth Reichl, Mimi Sheraton, David Maraniss, Natalie Angier and Sloane Crosley. His reorganization was described "smart and playful" by Adweek.

References 

Living people
People from Lake Forest, Illinois
Columbia College (New York) alumni
Vanity Fair (magazine) people
The Wall Street Journal people
American magazine editors
Year of birth missing (living people)